The Salisbury Glacier is a glacier in Greenland.

Geography
This glacier is located in the far northwest of Greenland, to the north of the Thule Air Base. It is one of four large glaciers which feeds the Wolstenholme Fjord (sometimes referred to as "the world's largest ice machine"). The other glaciers are the Chamberlin Glacier, the Knud Rasmussen Glacier, and the Harald Moltke Glacier.

See also
List of glaciers in Greenland

References

Glaciers of Greenland